Mycoarachis is a genus of fungi in the class Sordariomycetes.

References

Sordariomycetes genera
Bionectriaceae